The Bayas or Baia is a river of Spain. From its source in the Gorbeia massif in Biscay, it flows southwards through Álava before discharging into the Ebro River near Miranda de Ebro, Burgos.

See also
 Orthotrichum casasianum – an endemic species of moss growing in trees on the banks of the river

References

External links
 

Rivers of Spain
Rivers of the Basque Country (autonomous community)
Rivers of Castile and León
Rivers of Álava
Rivers of Biscay
Rivers of Burgos
Natura 2000 in the Basque Country (autonomous community)
Tributaries of the Ebro